Radhouane Charbib ( Ridwan Sharbeeb, born October 27, 1968) was recognized by the Guinness Book of Records as the tallest living man, until January 15, 2005 when Bao Xishun was measured at Chifeng City Hospital, Inner Mongolia, China, and was recorded as being 2 millimeters taller.

References

Living people
1968 births
People from Bizerte Governorate
People with gigantism
21st-century Tunisian people